Hurmuz may refer to:
 Hormuz (disambiguation)
 Urmuz (1883–1923), Romanian writer, lawyer and civil servant
 Ahura Mazda
 The Kingdom of Ormus

See also
 Hormizd (disambiguation)